Şeyda Hewramî was a mid 18th-century Kurdish poet from the city of Kermanshah in Iran.

References 

Kurdish poets
18th-century poets
People from Kermanshah

1784 births
1852 deaths
Iranian poets